The Eller Beck Formation is a geologic formation in England. It preserves fossils dating back to the Jurassic period. It consists of a lower unit less than 3 m thick consisting of mudstone with subordinate ironstone, with an upper unit typically 4–6 m thick consisting of fine-medium grained sandstone, further south it changes into finer grained facies with mudstone and limestone.

See also 
 List of fossiliferous stratigraphic units in England

References
 

Jurassic England
Aalenian Stage